Jung Jin-hee (born 10 April 1985) is a South Korean taekwondo practitioner. 

She won a gold medal in bantamweight at the 2007 World Taekwondo Championships in Beijing. She won a bronze medal at the 2010  Asian Taekwondo Championships.

References

External links

1985 births
Living people
South Korean female taekwondo practitioners
World Taekwondo Championships medalists
Asian Taekwondo Championships medalists
21st-century South Korean women